This article is about the gross regional product (GRP) per capita of Italian regions in nominal values. Values are shown in EUR€. For easy comparison, all the GRP figures are converted into US$ according to annual average exchange rates. All values are rounded to the nearest hundred.

Note: Trentino-South Tyrol has separate values measured for the two self-governing provinces that make up the region—the Province of Trento, commonly known as Trentino, and the Province of Bolzano, commonly known as South Tyrol. These are shown in the table below in italics.

2018

2017

2016

Notes

References 

Economy of Italy-related lists
GRP
GRP per capita
Italy
Italy, GRP per capita